Allotinus fallax is a butterfly in the family Lycaenidae. It is found in Asia.

Subspecies
A. f. fallax (Philippines: Luzon and Mindoro, Sibuyan, Cebu, Bohol)
A. f. aphacus Fruhstorfer, 1913 (Philippines: Mindanao, Camiguin de Minadanao and Panaon, Talaud)
A. f. apus de Nicéville, 1895 (Sumatra, western Malaysia)
A. f. audax H. H. Druce, 1895 Borneo (Kina Balu)
A. f. dotion Fruhstorfer, 1913 (Bazilan)
A. f. eryximachus Fruhstorfer, 1913 (Philippines: Mindoro)
A. f. tymphrestus Fruhstorfer, 1916 (Sulu Islands)

References

Butterflies described in 1865
Allotinus
Butterflies of Borneo
Butterflies of Indonesia
Butterflies of Asia
Taxa named by Baron Cajetan von Felder
Taxa named by Rudolf Felder